The Vatinsky Yogan is a river in Khanty-Mansi Autonomous Okrug, Russia.

The Vatinsky Yogan flows across the Central Siberian Plateau. Its basin is located in the Nizhnevartovsky District. Except for Vysoky there are no permanent settlements along the course of the river, but there are important oil and gas deposits.

Course 
The Vatinsky Yogan is a right tributary of the Ob river. It has its sources in the southern slopes of the Agansky Yuval, a low hilly area of the Siberian Uvaly. The river flows slowly among swamps south of the Tromyogan basin in an area of numerous small lakes. To the southeast lies the basin of the Vakh river. The Vatinsky Yogan heads generally in a western and southwestern direction and in its lower course it bends and flows for a stretch in a roughly WNW direction parallel to the Ob. Finally it meets the right bank of the Ob  from its mouth.

The Langepas - Nizhnevartovsk railway line passes along the river valley in its lower reaches.

Tributaries  
The river is fed mainly by snow and is frozen between October and May.

Flora 
Swampy taiga predominates in the basin of the river.

See also
List of rivers of Russia

References

External links
FGC UES - Overhead line of Surgutskaya GRES-2
Большие реки России (Great Rivers of Russia)
Rivers of Khanty-Mansi Autonomous Okrug
Central Siberian Plateau